Tommie Dukes (September 24, 1906 – January 5, 1991), nicknamed "Dixie", was an American Negro league catcher between 1928 and 1945.

A native of Picayune, Mississippi, Dukes made his Negro leagues debut in 1928 with the Chicago American Giants. He went on to play for several teams, including the Cuban House of David, Nashville Elite Giants and Homestead Grays, and finished his career back with the American Giants in 1945. Dukes died in Lumberton, Mississippi in 1991 at age 84.

References

External links
 and Baseball-Reference Black Baseball stats and Seamheads

1906 births
1991 deaths
Chicago American Giants players
Cuban House of David players
Homestead Grays players
Memphis Red Sox players
Nashville Elite Giants players
Toledo Crawfords players
Baseball catchers
Baseball players from Mississippi
People from Picayune, Mississippi
20th-century African-American sportspeople